Ruellia caroliniensis, the Carolina wild petunia, is a wild petunia with blue or violet flowers that appear in the spring, summer, and autumn. Its leaves are light green. This species is native to the southeastern United States.

References

External links
USDA Plants Profile

caroliniensis
Flora of the Southeastern United States
Plants described in 1841
Flora without expected TNC conservation status